Philip Lee Wadler (born April 8, 1956)  is an American computer scientist known for his contributions to programming language design and type theory. He is the chair of Theoretical Computer Science at the Laboratory for Foundations of Computer Science at School of Informatics, University of Edinburgh. He has contributed to the theory behind functional programming and the use of monads in functional programming, the design of the purely functional language Haskell, and the XQuery declarative query language. In 1984, he created the Orwell programming language. Wadler was involved in adding generic types to Java 5.0. He is also author of the paper Theorems for free! that gave rise to much research on functional language optimization (see also Parametricity).

Education
Wadler received a Bachelor of Science degree in mathematics from Stanford University in 1977, and a Master of Science degree in Computer Science from Carnegie Mellon University in 1979. He completed his Doctor of Philosophy in Computer Science at Carnegie Mellon University in 1984. His thesis was entitled Listlessness is Better than Laziness and was supervised by Nico Habermann.

Research and career
Wadler's research interests are in programming languages.

Wadler was a research fellow at the Programming Research Group (part of the Oxford University Computing Laboratory) and St Cross College, Oxford during 1983–87. He was progressively lecturer, reader, and professor at the University of Glasgow from 1987 to 1996. Wadler was a member of technical staff at Bell Labs, Lucent Technologies (1996–99) and then at Avaya Labs (1999–2003). Since 2003, he has been professor of theoretical computer science in the School of Informatics at the University of Edinburgh.

Wadler was editor of the Journal of Functional Programming from 1990 to 2004. Wadler is currently working on a new functional language designed for writing web applications, called Links. He has supervised numerous doctoral students to completion.

Since 2003, Wadler has been a professor of theoretical computer science at the Laboratory for Foundations of Computer Science at the University of Edinburgh and is the chair of Theoretical Computer Science. He is also a member of the university's Blockchain Technology Laboratory. He has a h-index of 72 with 26,874 citations at Google Scholar. As of December 2018 Wadler was area leader for programming languages at IOHK, the blockchain engineering company developing Cardano.

Awards and honours
Wadler received the Most Influential POPL Paper Award in 2003 for the 1993 Symposium on Principles of Programming Languages paper Imperative Functional Programming, jointly with Simon Peyton Jones.
In 2005, he was elected  Fellow of the Royal Society of Edinburgh (FRSE) in 2005. In 2007, he was inducted as an ACM Fellow by the Association for Computing Machinery (ACM).

References

1956 births
Living people
Stanford University alumni
Carnegie Mellon University alumni
American computer scientists
British computer scientists
Members of the Department of Computer Science, University of Oxford
Fellows of St Cross College, Oxford
Academics of the University of Glasgow
Scientists at Bell Labs
Academics of the University of Edinburgh
Functional programming
Programming language researchers
Formal methods people
Academic journal editors
Computer science writers
American textbook writers
American male non-fiction writers
Fellows of the Royal Society of Edinburgh
Fellows of the Association for Computing Machinery
American expatriates in the United Kingdom
People associated with Cardano